Pierre Billon (born Saint-Hippolyte-du-Fort, 7 February 1901 – died Paris, 31 August 1981) was a French film director and screenwriter.  In 1952 he served on the jury of the Cannes Festival.

Selected filmography
 Venetian Nights (1931)
 The House on the Dune (1934)
 Second Bureau (1935)
 Southern Mail (1937)
 The Silent Battle (1937)
 The Inevitable Monsieur Dubois (1943)
 Mademoiselle X (1945)
 Ruy Blas (1948)
 Clear the Ring (1949)
 My Friend Oscar (1951)
 My Seal and Them (1951)
 The Merchant of Venice (1953)

References

1901 births
1981 deaths
French film directors
French male screenwriters
20th-century French screenwriters
People from Gard
20th-century French male writers